Wu Yibing was the defending champion, but was no longer eligible to participate in junior tournaments.

Thiago Seyboth Wild won the title, defeating Lorenzo Musetti in the final, 6–1, 2–6, 6–2.

Seeds

Main draw

Finals

Top half

Section 1

Section 2

Bottom half

Section 3

Section 4

Qualifying

Seeds

Qualifiers

Lucky loser
  Henry Squire

Draw

First qualifier

Second qualifier

Third qualifier

Fourth qualifier

Fifth qualifier

Sixth qualifier

Seventh qualifier

Eighth qualifier

References

External links 
 Draw

Boys' Singles
US Open, 2018 Boys' Singles